Charles Robert Crim (born July 23, 1961) is a former Major League Baseball relief pitcher who played for the Milwaukee Brewers, the California Angels and the Chicago Cubs from 1987 to 1994.

Career
A 1979 graduate of Thousand Oaks High School, Crim went to school at the University of Hawaii at Manoa where he was an All-American pitcher.  He was drafted by the Brewers in the 17th round of the 1982 MLB amateur draft. He was a starter in his first two minor league seasons, before becoming a relief pitcher in 1984, finishing second in the Texas League in saves.

Crim played with the Brewers from 1987 to 1991. While with the Brewers, Crim led the American League in games pitched in both 1988 and 1989 and was voted "Top Set-Up Man" by The Sporting News. He was traded to the California Angels on December 10, 1991, for reliever Mike Fetters and a minor-league player. Crim played two seasons with the Angels before being released on May 31, 1993, with a nagging shoulder injury. The Chicago Cubs signed him on January 11, 1994, where he spent a very successful year at Wrigley Field. He retired following the season. Crim was a scout for the Los Angeles Dodgers from 2006 to 2009 then headed back onto the field as a pitching coach in the Dodgers minor league system. In 2009, he was the pitching coach for the Ogden Raptors Rookie Ball team. In 2010, he was the pitching coach for the Great Lakes Loons where his pitching staff led the league as well as finishing with 90 wins, a 2010 minor league season best. In 2011, he became the coach of the Chattanooga Lookouts. On November 13, 2012, Crim was promoted to be the Dodgers bullpen coach, a position he held through the 2015 season.

References

Sources

   

1961 births
Living people
American expatriate baseball players in Canada
Baseball coaches from California
Baseball players from California
Beloit Brewers players
California Angels players
Chicago Cubs players
El Paso Diablos players
Hawaii Rainbow Warriors baseball players
Iowa Cubs players
Los Angeles Dodgers coaches
Major League Baseball bullpen coaches
Major League Baseball pitchers
Milwaukee Brewers players
People from Thousand Oaks, California
People from Van Nuys, Los Angeles
Pikeville Brewers players
Sportspeople from Ventura County, California
Vancouver Canadians players
Pikeville Cubs players